Cortinarius aureofulvus is a fungus in the genus Cortinarius native to Belgium. It was described by Austrian mycologist Meinhard Michael Moser in 1970.

References

External links

psittacinus
Fungi of Europe
Fungi described in 1970
Taxa named by Meinhard Michael Moser